Anne Mägi (until 1980 Sookael; 1980-1989 Meri; born on 26 January 1960 in Paide) is an Estonian track and field athlete and coach.

1979-1985 she won several medals at Estonian Athletics Championships.

Students: Grit Šadeiko, Maris Mägi ja Rasmus Mägi. 

Awards:
 2014: Estonian Coach of the Year

Personal life
She is married to track and field athlete and coach Taivo Mägi. Her son is hurdler Rasmus Mägi and daughter is sprinter Maris Mägi.

References

Living people
1960 births
Estonian female sprinters
Estonian athletics coaches
University of Tartu alumni
Sportspeople from Paide